Xamir may refer to:
Xamtanga language
Bandar Khamir, a city in Iran